Lakshmikamadeva was a Thakuri king of Nepal who reigned from .

Reign 
From 1020, after Bhojadeva's disappearance, he was ruling jointly with Rudradeva. Rudradeva controlled the area of Patan, while Lakshmikamadeva ruled in Kantipur. After Rudradeva's death in around 1030, Lakshmikamadeva remained as the sole ruler of Nepal Mandala. While Jayadeva governed Patan between 1030 and 1038, Jayadeva's status was inferior than that of Lakshmikamadeva.

References

Citations

Bibliography 

 
 
 

Nepalese monarchs
History of Nepal
11th-century Nepalese people